Zújar, Spain may refer to:
Zújar municipality in Granada Province
Zújar River, a tributary of the Guadiana flowing through Cordoba Province and Extremadura